Wyszowate  (German: Wissowatten, Wischewatten, Wischowatten, Polish: Wisowate, Wiszowate, Wyszowate) is a village in the administrative district of Gmina Miłki, within Giżycko County, Warmian-Masurian Voivodeship, in northern Poland.

History
In 1475 the Teutonic Order komtur of Brandenburg Bernard von Balzhofen granted land to noble settlers coming from the Duchy of Masovia in return of their military service. The biggest part (8 włókas ) was given to Michał Wysowaty  who founded the village of Wyszowate.
Until 1945 the area was part of Germany (East Prussia).

References

Wyszowate